Carlos Mauricio Castrillo Alonzo (born 16 May 1985) is a Guatemalan professional football defender who currently plays for Liga Nacional club  Comunicaciones.

Club career
Castrillo began his career with Deportivo Jalapa in 2006, and joined Comunicaciones for the Apertura 2008-09 tournament.

International career
Castrillo made his debut for the full Guatemala national football team in an April 2008 friendly match against Haiti and had made 12 appearances at the start of February 2010, including 4 qualifying matches for the 2010 FIFA World Cup.

Honours
Jalapa
Liga Nacional de Guatemala: Apertura 2007
Comunicaciones 
Liga Nacional de Guatemala: Apertura 2009, Clausura 2011, Apertura 2011, Clausura 2013, Apertura 2013, Clausura 2014, Apertura 2014, Clausura 2015, Clausura 2022
CONCACAF League: 2021

External links
 Player profile - CSD Comunicaciones

References

1985 births
Living people
People from Jalapa Department
Guatemalan footballers
Guatemala international footballers
Comunicaciones F.C. players
2009 UNCAF Nations Cup players
2011 CONCACAF Gold Cup players
2014 Copa Centroamericana players
2015 CONCACAF Gold Cup players
Association football defenders